Henry Sevilla Oaminal Sr. (born October 11, 1958) is a Filipino politician, lawyer, and businessman serving as the Governor of Misamis Occidental since 2022. He was the Representative of Misamis Occidental's 2nd district from 2013 to 2022 and was a House Deputy Speaker from 2019 to 2022.

Political career
On July 10, 2020, Oaminal was one of the 70 representatives who voted to reject the franchise renewal of ABS-CBN.

Flagship Projects 

I. PANGUIL BAY BRIDGE PROJECT

 7.2 Billion Pesos Panguil Bay Bridge Project is the life-long dream of the Misamisnons way back 50 years ago.
 DS Oaminal raised the idea of revisiting the Panguil Bay Bridge Project construction during his First 100 Days Message to the District in 2013. He then worked tirelessly to bring the proposed project to fruition by coordinating with different offices such as the Mindanao Affairs Committee and the Regional Development Council in the House of Representatives, DPWH, NEDA Board and the Office of the President. Finally, in 2016 the loan agreement for the implementation of the project was signed.

II. MT MALINDANG 2ND DISTRICT ECO-TOURISM HIGHWAY (Sinacaban- Don Victoriano Mountain Road)

 Cost: 1.7 Billion Pesos 
 It connects the Municipalities of Sinacaban, Tudela, Clarin to the Cities of Ozamiz and Tangub to the Municipalities of Bonifacio and Don Victoriano.
 This Eco-Tourism Highway also makes accessible the tourist destinations in the district such as:

A) Sinacaban-features the natural swimming pool in the mountainous barangay of San Lorenzo;

B) Tudela-features the beauty of Brgy. Tongo and the Subanen Village; 

C) Clarin - features the nature and beauty of Brgy. Penacio and the proposed plan of putting a tourism establishment such as golf course and sports-related and    

entertainment activities;

D) Ozamiz City-features the Ozamiz Mega Sports Complex in Kinuman Norte;

E) Tangub – features the Gardens of the World;

F) Bonifacio-features the viewdeck and the Bonifacio Boulevard and seaport in Brgy. Migpange;

G) Don Victoriano- which will serve as the summer capital of the province and boasts of the Piduan Falls, Lake Duminagat, and the Business and Executive Village

III. AIRPORT AND SEAPORTS

A) MODERNIZATION OF LABO AIRPORT

 1.6 Billion Pesos
 Only airport throughout Philippines which has five (5) access roads leading to it which greatly eradicate traffic congestion to and from the airport. 

a) Lapasan to Ozamiz Airport; b) Gango to Ozamiz Airport; c) Maningcol to Airport; d) EMCOR to Aguada passing through Camella Homes to Ozamiz Airport; and e) Bañadero-Clabayan-Calangan to Labo Airport road.

B) CONSTRUCTION OF OZAMIZ SEAPORT 

 Alternative international port which will allow foreign vessels to dock in the city 

IV. FLOOD-CONTROL PROJECTS & DRAINAGE SYSTEM

A) USUGAN RIVER CONTROL PROJECT

 Php 1 Billion Pesos
 Saved a great deal of human lives, property and crops
 Addressed flooding problem

B) MIGKANAWAY RIVER CONTROL PROJECT

 500 Million Pesos
 Houses a multi-function facility for courtyard, public market, hotel and passenger terminal building (150 Million Pesos)

C) CLARIN RIVER CONTROL PROJECT

 350 Million Pesos

D) OZAMIZ CITY DRAINAGE 

 600 Million Pesos

V. IMPROVEMENT OF HEALTH & HOSPITAL SERVICES FACILITIES

RA No. 10865 (Oaminal Law 1) enacted in June 2016

 Converted the then Mayor Hilarion A. Ramiro Sr. Training and Teaching Hospital (MHARSTTH) into Mayor Hilarion A. Ramiro Sr. Medical Center (MHARS-MC) which increased the hospital’s bed capacity from 150 to 500 beds. This also allowed the hospital to cater to specialized cases and to acquire new laboratory and medical equipment.
 This provided additional wards and private rooms addressing the hospital’s shortage of rooms. Also, increased the numbers of doctors, nurses, medical personnel, and plantilla position personnel.

RA No. 11563 (Oaminal Law 3) enacted in June 2021

 Further increased the hospital’s bed capacity from 500 beds to 1,000 beds.

List of Bills Filled and Enacted into Law

Controversies

Lam-an housing project 

 In early 2020, at least 5 houses have been demolished in Barangay Lam-an, Ozamiz City to make way for a free housing project for informal settlers. Longtime home and landowners complained about 'harassment' and believed that the eviction lacked legal basis. Families were allegedly threatened to leave and 'pack up' by their barangay captain, councilor, and Oaminal himself. Oaminal debunked this claim saying that their family was always 'observant of the rule of law'.

Rodante Marcoleta, party-list representative of SAGIP, called on to have Oaminal investigated by the Committee on Ethics and the Committee on Good Government and Public Accountability for his alleged involvement in the illegal demolition for the Lam-an housing project. Marcoleta pointed out that the Nery family has a valid title to the property where their property stood. He pointed out that the construction of a housing project on private property is a violation of R.A. 7279 otherwise known as the 'Urban Development and Housing Act of 1992'.

House Speaker Lord Allan Velasco ordered hearings to stop, DIWA party list chairman Michael Aglipay confirmed. Oaminal was given 3 weeks to compensate the affected families.

DPWH corruption allegations 
In 2020, Oaminal was included in the list of 9 lawmakers who were allegedly involved in corruption related to infrastructure projects. He said that the report from the Presidential Anti-Corruption Commission is 'not a condemnation or indictment' and should 'not be taken as gospel of truth'. He says he supports the anti-graft campaign of President Rodrigo Duterte.

House session attendance despite positive COVID-19 test 
Oaminal attended the opening session of the House of Representatives on July 26, 2021, despite testing positive in a COVID-19 test taken on the day before President Rodrigo Duterte's sixth State of the Nation Address, breaking the isolation rules set by the Department of Health. Oaminal said he received his antigen in the evening before the SONA. He said he was immediately scheduled to get tested for COVID-19 in a lab. His sample was taken at 12:10 AM and he received his negative results at 5:15 AM before the SONA .

PNB case 
In 2021, the Supreme Court granted the petition of Philippine National Bank, overturning the decision of the Court of Appeals on June 1, 2015. PNB's petition seeks to revive criminal charges against Oaminal for six bouncing checks worth P12,797,767.20 in 2002. The court has directed the second branch of the Municipal Court in Ozamiz City to resume the trial on G.R. No. 219325 for six counts of violation of Batas Pambansa (PB) Bilang 22, otherwise known as the Bouncing Checks Law.

See also
 House of Representatives of the Philippines
 2022 Philippine gubernatorial elections
 Ozamiz City
 https://www.oaminal.com/

References

21st-century Filipino politicians
20th-century Filipino lawyers
1958 births
Living people